Juhan Maksim (19 December 1886 – 12 July 1941 Viljandi) was an Estonian politician. He was a member of II Riigikogu. He was a member of the Riigikogu since 18 November 1924. He replaced Johann Põlenik. On 20 December 1924, he was removed from his position and he was replaced by August Männikson. On 12 July 1941, shortly after the Wehrmacht had advanced into southern Estonia, Maksim was executed in Viljandi by the German occupation authorities.

References

1886 births
1941 deaths
Workers' United Front politicians
Members of the Riigikogu, 1923–1926
Estonian people executed by Nazi Germany